Herttoniemen teollisuusalue (Finnish) is a southeastern neighborhood of Helsinki, Finland.

Herttoniemi